The Last Shall Be First is the debut studio album by American hip hop group Sunz of Man. It was released on July 21, 1998, through Red Ant Entertainment/Wu-Tang Records. Production was handled by 4th Disciple, True Master, RZA, Supreme and Wyclef Jean, with Cathy Jones and Sunz of Man serving as executive producers. It features guest appearances from Method Man, Traybag, Beretta 9, Earth, Wind & Fire, Masta Killa, Ol' Dirty Bastard, Raekwon and U-God.

The album peaked at number 20 on the Billboard 200 and number 7 on the Top R&B/Hip-Hop Albums in the United States, as well as number 100 on the Dutch Album Top 100.

Track listing

Personnel

Chron "Hell Razah" Smith – vocals (tracks: 2-8, 11-15, 17, 18), A&R
Virgil "Prodigal Sunn" Ruff – vocals (tracks: 2-6, 8, 10-15, 17)
Frederick "60 Second Assassin" Cuffie – vocals (tracks: 4-6, 8, 10, 12-14, 17, 18)
Walter "Killah Priest" Reed – vocals (tracks: 3, 4, 7, 8)
Tracy "Trebag" Smith – vocals (tracks: 3, 7)
Clifford "Method Man" Smith – vocals (tracks: 11, 17)
Elgin "Masta Killa" Turner – vocals (track 5)
Russell "Ol' Dirty Bastard" Jones – vocals (track 6)
Earth, Wind & Fire – vocals (track 6)
Derek "True Master" Harris – vocals (track 11), producer (tracks: 4, 11, 14, 17, 18), mixing (tracks: 11, 17, 18)
Corey "Raekwon" Woods – vocals (track 18)
Lamont "U-God" Hawkins – vocals (track 18)
Lashaunda "Harmony" – backing vocals (track 14)
Selwyn "4th Disciple" Bogard – producer (tracks: 2, 5, 10, 13), mixing (track 2)
Robert "RZA" Diggs – producer (tracks: 8, 12, 15), engineering (track 12)
Alaric "Supreme" Wilder – producer (tracks: 3, 7)
Rob Chiarelli – additional producer (tracks: 3, 4, 7, 8, 10, 12, 13, 15), mixing (tracks: 3, 4, 6-8, 10, 12-15), additional mixing (track 17)
Nolan 'Dr. No' Moffitte – engineering (tracks: 2, 5, 10, 11, 17, 18)
Carlos Bess – engineering (tracks: 4, 8, 15)
Tony Black – engineering (track 3)
Steve Hall – mastering
Cathy Jones – executive producer
Tom Jermann – art direction, design
Michael Lavine – photography
Meredith Brunswick – A&R
Tony Calcote – A&R
James Elliott – A&R

Charts

References

External links

1998 debut albums
Sunz of Man albums
Albums produced by RZA
Albums produced by True Master
Albums produced by Wyclef Jean
Albums produced by 4th Disciple